The iliococcygeal raphe is a raphe representing the midline location where the levatores ani converge.

See also
 Anococcygeal body

References

Pelvis